The Martin Agency American advertising agency based in Richmond, Virginia, that is part of the Interpublic Group of Companies. The company's CEO is Kristen Cavallo.

History

The Martin Agency was founded as Martin & Woltz in Richmond, Virginia in 1965 by David N. Martin and George Woltz. 

The development of the "Virginia is for Lovers" tagline, one of the most recognized taglines in the tourism industry and beyond, launched the trajectory of the agency. Written in 1969 by copywriter Robin McLaughlin, the slogan entered the Madison Avenue Walk of Fame in 2009.

Martin and Woltz divided the firm in 1975 and Martin renamed the company The Martin Agency.

In 1986, Scali, McCabe, Sloves purchased a majority interest in The Martin Agency. Scali, McCabe, Sloves was acquired by Lowe Group in 1993. The Interpublic Group of Companies (IPG) bought controlling interest in The Martin Agency in 1994. The Martin Agency was previously under McCann Worldgroup and is currently part of the MullenLowe network at IPG.

The agency’s current client roster (as of June 2021) includes GEICO (since 1995), OREO, UPS, Unilever’s AXE brand, RITZ, DoorDash, Buffalo Wild Wings, CarMax, Hanes, Century 21, Gap Inc.’s Old Navy, Terminix, TIAA, Three by Berkshire Hathaway, Happy Egg, Tracfone, Penske, Virginia Tourism, Busch Light, Sabra, Nerf, Clue, Santander, Science Moms, Donate Life, Now Upon a Time and the JFK Museum and Cultural Center and others. 

The Martin Agency and GEICO are credited with pioneering a new way of advertising in the insurance category in the early 1990s, spawning a list of imitators in the category.

Previous agency clients include: Walmart, Discover, NASCAR, Mercedes-Benz, Pizza Hut, Saab, Wrangler, CarFax, The Learning Channel, the American Cancer Society and others. 

In 2009, Adweek named The Martin Agency as its "U.S. Agency of the Year."

In 2020, Adweek again named The Martin Agency as its "U.S. Agency of the Year.". Danny Robinson became the Agency's Chief Creative Officer in this year as well.

In 2021, Adweek named The Martin Agency as its "U.S. Agency of the Year," only the third agency to win the honor in back-to-back years. Ad Age named The Martin Agency #8 on its annual A-List.

In 2023, Advertising Age named The Martin Agency as its "Agency of the Year."

Notable campaigns
 Virginia is for Lovers 
 Nickelodeon "Because We Can"
 GEICO Cavemen
 The GEICO Gecko
 FreeCreditScore.com
 DoorDash #Openfordelivery 
 UPS What can brown do for you? 
 GEICO Best Of GEICO

Coinbase Super Bowl ad controversy
In February 2022, The Martin Agency CEO Kristen Cavallo criticized Coinbase CEO Brian Robinson for not acknowledging the role that agencies had played in the creation of its Super Bowl ad.

The incident prompted a wider dialogue within the industry about how agencies are treated.

Awards
 Adweek U.S. Agency of the Year: 2009
 Adweek U.S. Agency of the Year: 2020
Adweek U.S. Agency of the Year: 2021
Ad Age A-List: 2021
Ad Age Agency of the Year: 2023

References

External links
Martinagency.com
"Clan of the Caveman" by Linda Tischler for FastCompany.com
"Agency Profile: The Martin Agency" by Ignacio Oreamuno for ihaveanidea.com

Advertising agencies of the United States
Companies based in Richmond, Virginia
Interpublic Group
American companies established in 1965
1965 establishments in Virginia